Turid Wickstrand Iversen (born 29 December 1934) is a Norwegian politician for the Conservative Party. She served as a deputy representative to the Norwegian Parliament from Buskerud during the term 1993–1997. On the local level, Iversen is a former mayor of Drammen and succeeded by Labour politician Lise Christoffersen.

References

1934 births
Living people
Conservative Party (Norway) politicians
Deputy members of the Storting
Mayors of places in Buskerud
Politicians from Drammen
Women mayors of places in Norway
20th-century Norwegian women politicians
20th-century Norwegian politicians
Women members of the Storting